The wife of Julius Nepos was the last empress of the Roman Empire in the West, whose husband reigned from 474 through 480, although he was in exile from his capital after 475. His surname, Nepos, he obtained through his marriage. His wife's given name is not in any primary source, all of which report her as the neptis of Leo I the Thracian of the Roman Empire in the East (457–74), and his spouse Verina. The word neptis could translate as granddaughter, niece or (close) relative, but it is usually assumed that Julius' wife was Leo's niece, and more likely related by blood to Verina rather than Leo. The historian Malchus reports, "Verina also joined in urging this, giving a helping hand to the wife of Nepos, her relative".

Julius' marriage may have been part of a pattern of family patronage: "marriage into the imperial family was a highly advantageous affair, and marriage to an emperor's daughter allowed the son-in-law to hope for the purple". Both emperors and empresses once elevated to their position would attempt to promote relatives to high offices and help them marry into illustrious lineages. While these extended families on occasion failed to succeed to the throne, they did manage to endure political upheavals and remain prominent for generations.

Verina certainly seems to have played her part in advancing relatives. Between 468 and 476, Basiliscus, Armatus and Nepos assumed high-ranking military positions. All three were related to her by blood or marriage. During the same period, Verina's daughters Ariadne and Leontia were married respectively to Zeno and Marcian, later an emperor and a usurper, respectively. She may even had something to do with the rise to prominence of the barbarian Odoacer, theorised to be her nephew.

References

Sources

External links 
Page in "The Cambridge ancient history 14" commenting on Verina and her relatives

House of Leo
5th-century Byzantine people
5th-century Byzantine women
5th-century Roman empresses
Unidentified people
5th-century Roman women